Hotel Mirage (Xотел Мираж in Bulgarian) is a 4-stars business hotel and at 95 meters the highest building in Burgas, Bulgaria.

It is also the 6th highest building in Bulgaria.

The building shape is formed like the mast of a ship in full sail.

See also 
List of tallest buildings in Bulgaria

References

External links 
Homepage
Location on Google Maps.

Skyscrapers in Bulgaria
Hotels in Burgas

Hotel buildings completed in 2002